An event horizon is a boundary around a black hole inside which events cannot effect an outside observer.

Event horizon or Event Horizon may also refer to:

Event Horizon Telescope, a type of astronomical interferometer
Event Horizon (film), a 1997 science fiction/horror film
 Event Horizon (sculpture), a 2007 site installation by Antony Gormley
 Event Horizon, a fictional company in the novels of the Greg Mandel trilogy by English science fiction writer Peter F. Hamilton
 Event Horizon (album), a 2012 album by I Am I
 Event Horizons BBS, a bulletin board system that ran from 1983 to 1996
 Event Horizon Software, the original name of American computer game developer DreamForge Intertainment
 "Event Horizon" (Supergirl), an episode of Supergirl
"the event horizon", 2019 poem by Simon Armitage to commemorate opening of Halle St Peter's extension

See also
Event Horizon Telescope, international collaborative project
 Horizon (general relativity)